Amberg is an electoral constituency (German: Wahlkreis) represented in the Bundestag. It elects one member via first-past-the-post voting. Under the current constituency numbering system, it is designated as constituency 232. It is located in central northern Bavaria, comprising the city of Amberg and the districts of Amberg-Sulzbach and Neumarkt.

Amberg was created for the inaugural 1949 federal election. Since 2021, it has been represented by Susanne Hierl of the Christian Social Union (CSU).

Geography
Amberg is located in central northern Bavaria. As of the 2021 federal election, it comprises the independent city of Amberg and the districts of Amberg-Sulzbach and Neumarkt.

History
Amberg was created in 1949. In the 1965 through 1972 elections, it was known as Amberg – Neumarkt. Since the 1976 election, it has again been named Amberg. In the 1949 election, it was Bavaria constituency 19 in the numbering system. In the 1953 through 1961 elections, it was number 214. In the 1965 through 1998 elections, it was number 218. In the 2002 and 2005 elections, it was number 233. Since the 2009 election, it has been number 232.

Originally, the constituency comprised the independent cities of Amberg and Neumarkt in der Oberpfalz and the districts of Landkreis Amberg, Landkreis Neumarkt in der Oberpfalz, and Sulzbach-Rosenberg. From 1965 through 1972, it also contained the districts of Beilngries, Riedenburg, and Parsberg. It acquired its current borders in the 1976 election.

Members
The constituency has been held continuously by the Christian Social Union (CSU) since its creation. It was first represented by Josef Schatz from 1949 to 1953, followed by Anton Donhauser from 1953 to 1957. Heinrich Aigner then served from 1957 to 1980. Hermann Fellner was representative for three terms from 1980 to 1990. He was succeeded by Rudolf Kraus from 1990 to 2005. Alois Karl was elected in 2005 and served until 2021. He was succeeded by Susanne Hierl in 2021.

Election results

2021 election

2017 election

2013 election

2009 election

Notes

References

Federal electoral districts in Bavaria
1949 establishments in West Germany
Constituencies established in 1949
Amberg
Amberg-Sulzbach
Neumarkt (district)